Mogollon Baldy is one of the tallest mountains in the Mogollon Mountains of New Mexico in the United States. It is in the Gila National Forest and the Gila Wilderness. The summit marks the boundary between the Wilderness Ranger District and the Glenwood Ranger District.

This area was severely impacted by the Whitewater-Baldy Complex Fire of 2012 which was the largest wildfire in New Mexico state history.

References

External links
 

Landforms of Catron County, New Mexico
Mountains of New Mexico
Mountains of Catron County, New Mexico